The Internationaux de Tennis Feminin Nice is a defunct WTA Tour affiliated tennis tournament played in 2001. It was held in Nice in France and played on indoor hard courts.

Results

Singles

Doubles

References
 WTA Tournament Profiles Page

 
Indoor tennis tournaments
Hard court tennis tournaments
Tennis tournaments in France
WTA Tour